The Meath Chronicle is a local newspaper serving County Meath, Ireland and based in the town of Navan. Publication is weekly. It is owned by Celtic Media Group.

Circulation as of 2008 was 14,651. According to ABC, circulation declined to 10,373 for the period July 2012 to December 2012, this represented a fall of 5% on a year-on-year basis.

References

External links

Meath Chronicle at Irish Newspaper Archives

Mass media in County Meath
Navan
Newspapers published in the Republic of Ireland
Publications with year of establishment missing
Weekly newspapers published in Ireland